Anke Eymer is a German politician of the Christian Democratic Union (CDU) and former member of the German Bundestag.

Life 
She was a member of the German Bundestag from 1990 to 2009. As a member of the German Bundestag, she was a member of the Committee on Women and Youth, the Committee on Family and Senior Citizens and later a member of the Committee on Foreign Affairs, rapporteur for international women's policy, international cultural policy and for sub-Saharan Africa.

References 

1949 births
Living people
Members of the Bundestag for Schleswig-Holstein
Members of the Bundestag 2005–2009
Members of the Bundestag 2002–2005
Members of the Bundestag 1998–2002
Members of the Bundestag 1994–1998
Members of the Bundestag 1990–1994
Female members of the Bundestag
20th-century German women politicians
21st-century German women politicians
Members of the Bundestag for the Christian Democratic Union of Germany